MOM Brands Company (formerly Malt-O-Meal Company and Campbell Cereal Company) was an American producer of breakfast cereals, headquartered in Northfield, Minnesota. It marketed its products in at least 70% of the country's grocery stores, with estimated sales in 2012 of US$750 million. It operated four manufacturing plants, in Northfield, Minnesota; Tremonton, Utah; Asheboro, North Carolina; and St. Ansgar, Iowa. The company had distribution centers in Grove City, Ohio; Coppell, Texas; and Salt Lake City, Utah.

MOM Brands produced both hot and cold cereals. As of 2012, cold cereals manufactured by MOM Brands accounted for over 75% of its total sales. Most of its cold cereals are similar to cereal brands produced by its competitors, Kellogg's and General Mills.

MOM Brands was bought by Post Holdings in 2015.

History

The company was founded in 1919 as the Campbell Cereal Company by John Campbell, a miller in Owatonna, Minnesota. He invented a combination of  farina wheat and malted barley hot breakfast cereal he called Malt-O-Meal. Campbell intended to compete with Cream of Wheat.

In 1927, the company moved production of its cereal to the Ames Mill in Northfield, Minnesota. Nine years later, corporate headquarters were moved to Minneapolis, Minnesota, and in 1953, it was renamed the Malt-O-Meal Company.

Attempts in the 1940s to market Campbell's Corn Flakes, and in the 1960s to sell State Fair brand Puffed Wheat and Puffed Rice, were abandoned in the face of competition.

The company sponsors "Make it with Malt-O-Meal" State Fair Recipe Contests at the Oregon and Arizona State Fairs.

In 2002, Malt-O-Meal acquired the bagged cereal business from the Quaker Oats Company.

In 2007, Malt-O-Meal took part in the "reverse product placement" marketing campaign for The Simpsons Movie and packaged one of their cereals, Tootie Frooties, as "Krusty-O's". The cereal was sold in 7-Eleven stores across America along with other The Simpsons Movie related products.

In 2007, Malt-O-Meal began construction on their new manufacturing facility in Asheboro, North Carolina. The building, formerly occupied by Unilever Best Foods, became the fourth manufacturing facility for Malt-O-Meal. Operations at the plant began in late 2008.

In December 2009, Malt-O-Meal acquired the Farina brand of hot cereal from U.S. Mills. Farina was started by Pillsbury in 1898.

On February 21, 2012, the Malt-O-Meal Company re-branded as MOM Brandsthe new name is intended to reflect the company's wider product range, while still acknowledging its flagship product through the use of its abbreviation. At the same time, it also announced that it had surpassed Post to become the third largest producer of cereals in the United States.

MOM Brands purchased the CoCo Wheats brand from Denny and Kim Fuller on June 30, 2012, while the rest of the company assets except the factory building were sold to Gilster-Mary Lee, a major competitor. The Fullers had become the fourth generation to own and operate Little Crow in 1983.

October 11, 2013, MOM Brands announced a reduction in force that would affect approximately 100 employees. Voluntary separations were taken until October 18 and resulted in 35 people applying, but not all were approved. Remaining employees were notified beginning October 25, with 88 employees affected.

On January 27, 2015, Post Holdings announced that it was purchasing MOM Brands for $1.15 billion ($1.05 billion cash and 2.5 million shares of Post Holdings stock). The sale was completed on May 4, 2015. Production of cold cereal continued in the Northfield plant. As of February 2017, Post is continuing the Malt-o-Meal brand.

Hot cereals
Malt-O-Meal
Chocolate Malt-O-Meal
Oat Fit  
Coco Wheats
Maple & Brown Sugar Malt-O-Meal
Creamy Hot Wheat Malt-O-Meal

Cold cereals
 Apple Zings
 Berry Colossal Crunch
 Blueberry Muffin Tops
 Cinnamon Toasters
 Chocolate Marshmallow Mateys  
 Chocolatey Chip Cookie Bites
 Cocoa Dyno-Bites  
 Coco Roos  
 Colossal Crunch
 Cookies and Cream
 Corn Bursts
 Corn Flakes
 Crispy Rice
 Frosted Mini-Spooners
 Frosted Flakes
 Fruity Dyno-Bites  
 Fruity Stars
 Golden Puffs
 Cinnamon Golden Puffs
 Honey and Oat Blenders
 Honey Buzzers
 Honey Graham Squares
 Honey Nut Scooters
 Marshmallow Mateys
 Peanut Butter Cups  
 Peanut Butter Colossal Crunch  
 Puffed Rice  
 Puffed Wheat
 Raisin Bran
 Scooters
 S'Mores Cereal
 Tootie Fruities

Other brands
As listed on Malt-O-Meal's site.  Most are available regionally or through specific chains.
All listed mention their use of natural ingredients, reduced packaging, and/or renewable energy
Sally's Cereals (hot and cold varieties sold in Canada Safeway, Wal-mart and Superstores stores)
Three Sisters cereal (hot and cold varieties, sold only at Whole Foods stores)
Mom's Best Naturals (hot and cold varieties)
Bear River Valley (cold varieties only)
I Love Oats (hot varieties only)
 Better Oats (hot varieties only) (most sub-brands available in multiple flavors)
 Oat Revolution  
 Oat Revolution Thick & Hearty  
 Abundance
 Good 'N Hearty  
 Lavish
 mmm... Muffins
 Oat Fit  
 Oat Heads  
 Raw Pure & Simple
 Mom's Best Naturals  
Hearty Traditions (hot varieties only)
Naturally Nora (hot varieties only)

Additional brands:

 Millville
 Cub Foods
 Diamond Crystal
 Fastco
 Flavorite
 Foodland
 Good 'n Hearty
 Hearty Traditions
 Hy-Top
 IGA (Store brand)
 Mom's Best Natural
 Megaroons
 Our Family
 Richfood
 Shop 'n Save (Store brand)
 Smart Menu

See also
Post Holdings

References

External links
 Malt-O-Meal

Breakfast cereal companies
Food and drink companies based in Minnesota
Northfield, Minnesota
American companies established in 1919
Food and drink companies established in 1919
Post Holdings